Joshua John Watson (born 31 July 1977) is an Australian backstroke swimmer who won a silver medal in the 4×100-metre medley relay at the 2000 Summer Olympics in Sydney.

Training at the Kingscliff club near the Queensland border, and coached by Greg Salter, 
Watson became Australian champion in the 50-metre backstroke in 1996.  However, as it was not an Olympic event, he did not gain national selection until 1997, when he competed at the 1997 FINA Short Course World Championships in Gothenburg, Sweden.  In 1998, he made his international long-course debut at the 1998 Commonwealth Games, where he won a silver medal in the 100-metre backstroke and a gold medal in the medley relay. Josh was Australia's first male Backstroke World Champion when he won the 200m Backstroke at the 1999 FINA Short Course World Championships in Hong Kong. He also won bronze in the 100-metre backstroke at the 1999 Pan Pacific Swimming Championships in Sydney.

At the 2000 Summer Olympics in Sydney, Watson swam the backstroke leg in the heats of the 4×100-metre medley relay, before being replaced by Matt Welsh in the team that trailed the United States team home in the final. Watson was also a finalist in the 100-metre backstroke, where he was narrowly beaten into fourth place. Watson continued to be selected in the same role (except for a self-imposed break in 2002) until the 2004 Summer Olympics in Athens, when he failed to qualify for the semifinals of the 100-metrebackstroke. This enabled him to collect a gold medal in the 4×100-metre medley relay at the 2001 World Aquatics Championships in Fukuoka, Japan.

Watson now lives in Atlanta, Georgia with his wife Tess.

See also
 List of Commonwealth Games medallists in swimming (men)
 List of Olympic medalists in swimming (men)

References
 

1977 births
Living people
Australian male backstroke swimmers
Swimmers at the 2000 Summer Olympics
Swimmers at the 2004 Summer Olympics
Olympic swimmers of Australia
Olympic silver medalists for Australia
Sportspeople from Newcastle, New South Wales
Commonwealth Games silver medallists for Australia
Commonwealth Games gold medallists for Australia
Medalists at the FINA World Swimming Championships (25 m)
Medalists at the 2000 Summer Olympics
Olympic silver medalists in swimming
Commonwealth Games medallists in swimming
Swimmers at the 1998 Commonwealth Games
Sportsmen from New South Wales
Australian emigrants to the United States
Medallists at the 1998 Commonwealth Games